Khailad is a village development committee in Kailali District But now it is combine with Bhajani Municipality in the Seti Zone of western Nepal. At the time of the 1991 Nepal census it had a population of 5734 living in 610 individual households.

References

External links
UN map of the municipalities of Kailali District

Populated places in Kailali District